Dorothea Lambert Chambers defeated Winifred McNair 6–0, 6–4 in the all comers' final to win the ladies' singles tennis title at the 1913 Wimbledon Championships. The reigning champion Ethel Larcombe did not defend her title.

This was the last time all eight quarterfinalists would come from Europe until 2011.

Draw

All comers' finals

Top half

Section 1

Section 2

Bottom half

Section 3

Section 4

References

External links

Women's Singles
Wimbledon Championship by year – Women's singles
Wimbledon Championships - Singles
Wimbledon Championships - Singles